Stella Menna (born 18 February 1988) is an Italian former professional tennis player and an Italian food blogger known as Unastellaincucina.

Menna, a right-handed player from Rome, featured in the junior draws at the 2005 Australian Open.

On the professional tour, Menna reached a career-high singles ranking of 336. In 2007 she made her WTA Tour main draw debut in the women's doubles of the 2007 Rome Masters and featured in her only other main draw a week later at the 2007 İstanbul Cup, also in doubles.

ITF finals

Singles: 5 (1–4)

Doubles: 3 (1–2)

References

External links
 
 

1988 births
Living people
Italian female tennis players
Tennis players from Rome
21st-century Italian women